The 2012 Pan American Combined Events Cup was held in Ottawa, Ontario, Canada, at the Terry Fox Stadium on May 26–27, 2012. 
The event was held jointly with the Athletics Ontario Senior Combined Events Championships.
A detailed report on the event and an appraisal of the results was given.

Complete results were published.

Medallists

Results

Men's Decathlon
Key

Women's Heptathlon
Key

Participation
An unofficial count yields the participation of 27 athletes from 10 countries.  In addition, there was one invited athlete, and 15 local competitors as guests.

 (1)
 (1)
 (7)
 (1)
 (4)
 (1)
 (1)
 (4)
 (1)
 (6)
Invited:
 (1)

See also
 2012 in athletics (track and field)

References

Pan American Combined Events Cup
Pan American Combined Events Cup
International track and field competitions hosted by Canada
Pan American Combined Events Cup